"El manisero", known in English as "The Peanut Vendor", is a Cuban son-pregón composed by Moisés Simons. It has been recorded more than 160 times, sold over a million copies of the sheet music, and was the first million-selling 78 rpm single of Cuban music.

History

The score and lyrics of "El manisero" were by Moises Simons (1889–1945), the Cuban son of a Spanish musician. It sold over a million copies of sheet music for E.B. Marks Inc., and this netted $100,000 in royalties for Simons by 1943. Its success led to a 'rumba craze' in the US and Europe which lasted through the 1940s. The consequences of the Peanut Vendor's success were quite far-reaching.

The number was first sung and recorded by the vedette Rita Montaner in 1927 or 1928 for Columbia Records. The biggest record sales for "El manisero" came from the recording made by Don Azpiazú and his Havana Casino Orchestra in New York in 1930 for RCA Victor. The band included a number of star musicians such as Julio Cueva (trumpet) and Mario Bauza (saxophone); Antonio Machín was the singer. There seems to be no authoritative account of the number of 78 rpm records of this recording sold by Victor; but it seems likely that the number would have exceeded the sheet music sales, making it the first million-selling record of Cuban (or even Latin) music.

The lyrics were in a style based on street vendors' cries, a pregón; and the rhythm was a son, so technically this was a son-pregón. On the record label, however, it was called a "rumba-fox trot", reflecting its Cuban origin and the  rhythm that suits the fox-trot dance. Thereafter, the term rhumba (the anglicized spelling of rumba) was used as a general label for Cuban music, as salsa is today, because the numerous Cuban terms were not understood abroad. Rhumba was easy to say and remember.

On the published score both music and lyrics are attributed to Simons, though there is a persistent story that they were written by Gonzalo G. de Mello in Havana the night before Montaner was due to record it in New York. Cristóbal Díaz says "For various reasons, we have doubts about this version... 'El manisero' was one of those rare cases in popular music where an author got immediate and substantial financial benefits... logically Mello would have tried to reclaim his authorship of the lyrics, but that did not occur." The second attack on the authorship of the lyrics came from none other than the great Fernando Ortiz. For Ortiz, the true author was an unknown Havana peanut seller, of the second half of the 19th century, who served as the basis for a danza written by Louis Moreau Gottschalk. Of course, it may be that elements of the song were to be found in real life. The English lyrics are by L. Wolfe Gilbert and Marion Sunshine; the latter was Azpiazú's sister-in-law, who toured with the band in the US as singer. The English lyrics are, in the opinion of Ned Sublette, of almost unsurpassed banality.

"The Peanut Vendor" had a second life as a hit number when Stan Kenton recorded it with his big band for Capitol Records, in 1947. This was also a great and long-lasting hit, re-recorded by Kenton twice with the band, and played by him later in life as a piano solo. The Kenton version was entirely instrumental, with the rhythmic pattern emphasized by trombones.

Legacy and influence
The Peanut Vendor has been recorded more than 160 times. Because of its cultural importance, it was included into the United States National Recording Registry in 2005 by the National Recording Preservation Board, which noted:
"It is the first American recording of an authentic Latin dance style. This recording launched a decade of 'rumbamania', introducing U.S. listeners to Cuban percussion instruments and Cuban rhythms." The song was inducted into the Latin Grammy Hall of Fame in 2001. 
Several films included versions of "El Manisero". It appeared in The Cuban Love Song by MGM (1931), with Ernesto Lecuona as musical advisor; Groucho Marx whistled the tune in the film Duck Soup (1933); Cary Grant sang it in the film Only Angels Have Wings (1939); Jane Powell sang the song in Luxury Liner (1948); Judy Garland sang a fragment in the film A Star is Born (1954). The Peanut Vendor was used as the tune in an advertising campaign for Golden Wonder Peanuts in the 1960s and '70s.  More recently, it was featured in the Carnaval scene of José Luis Cuerda's La lengua de las mariposas (Butterfly 1999), as well as in the reunion gala scene of David O. Russell’s Amsterdam (2022). The Peanut Vendor was played by Ska legend Tommy McCook and used in such classic reggae songs as "Top Ten" by Gregory Issacs.

Cuban music—which has prominent African-derived elements—was also very popular in Central and West Africa starting in Kinshasa in the 1930s and spreading throughout Africa. In the 1960s, famous Nigerian High Life musician Cardinal Rex Lawson used the tune from The Peanut Vendor in his hit song Sawale. Because of this song, the melody remains known to this day in Nigeria and was recently used by Nigerian musician Flavour N'abania in his song "Nwa Baby" (2011), including the remix.

Selected recordings 
The song exists in 160+ recorded versions, including:
1928 Rita Montaner for Columbia records. This was the first recording. Tumbao TCD 46.
1930 Don Azpiazú and his Havana Casino Orchestra for RCA Victor. The version which started the rumba craze; singer Antonio Machín. Harlequin HQ 10.
1930 Antonio Machín with the Cuarteto Machín. Harlequin HQ 24.
1930 California Ramblers. Columbia 2351. First recording by a U.S. group.
1931 Bert Ambrose and his Orchestra. Due to authentic percussion instruments being unavailable for the recording, the arranger (Sid Phillips) had to improvise his own.
1931? Sexteto Okeh (Los Jardineros) Okeh 14027.
1931 Louis Armstrong and his Sebastian New Cotton Club Orchestra OKeh 41478. First version by a U.S. jazz group; also on Parlophone PMC  7098.
1933 Red Nichols. A stop-motion animated music video for this version was created by New Zealand artist and animator Len Lye.
1938 Rosita Serrano, as "Manicero", released on: Telefunken A 2749 (recorded: Berlin, Oct.-03-1938)
1947 Stan Kenton. The second largest selling 78rpm version. First significant instrumental version.
1949 Django Reinhardt
1952 Dean Martin
1956 Abelardo Barroso, Orquesta Sensación, "El Manisero," Puchito 262, 78 rpm matrix – FB-OB-3113; 45 rpm matrix – 45 G8-OW-3113 
1957 Stan Kenton, his band's second recording of the song: Kenton in Hi-Fi
1958 Anita O'Day on Anita Sings the Winners (Verve)
1950s Pérez Prado for RCA Victor
1950s Conroy (Conrado) Wilson & His Combo, "El Manisero," Puchito 620-A, 45 rpm matrix – ICD-45-946 B; also released as Puchito 45-8012
1960 Chet Atkins for RCA Victor
1961 Rolando Laserie and Tito Puente
1966 Clark Terry and Chico O'Farrill on Spanish Rice.
1961 Alvin "Red" Tyler. Instrumental. Used in the 5th episode of season 2 of the acclaimed TV series Breaking Bad, "Breakage".
1998 Esquivel Instrumental. Originally recorded and included in 1960's "See It in Sound" but not released until 1998.
2001 Gonzalo Rubalcaba. Instrumental version included on the album Supernova.

References 

1927 songs
1930 singles
Cuban songs
Latin Grammy Hall of Fame Award recipients
RCA Victor singles
Rhumba
Sones cubanos
Songs written by L. Wolfe Gilbert
Street cries
United States National Recording Registry recordings
Stop-motion animated music videos